James McStay (1 April 1895 – 31 December 1973) was a Scottish football player and manager. He spent most of his career at Celtic, and was a captain and manager for the club.

Career
A full back (successfully converted from left half by manager Willie Maley), he joined Celtic in 1920 and took over the club captaincy from his elder brother Willie McStay in 1929. The siblings played together 246 times for Celtic as well in as one Scottish League XI match in 1926 and a Scottish Football Association summer tour of North America in 1927; however unlike Willie, Jimmy never gained a full international cap. Taking all cups into account he played in exactly 500 matches for Celtic, ranking 14th on the club's all-time list and making the most appearances overall for the Hoops without being selected for his country (Charlie Shaw holds the unwanted record in terms of Scottish Football League matches).

McStay managed Celtic between 9 February 1940 and 23 July 1945 but this coincided with the suspension of the League and Scottish Cup during wartime, meaning he never had the opportunity to manage the club in official competitions. He also managed Irish club Brideville and Alloa Athletic prior to his appointment at Celtic, and afterwards took charge of Hamilton Academical (where he had also finished his playing career, appearing for Accies in the 1935 Scottish Cup Final aged 40).

In addition to Willie and Jimmy, another McStay brother, Francis, was also a footballer, played for Motherwell in the 1910s. Their great-great-nephews Paul and Willie and Raymond played professionally in the 1980s and 1990s (Paul also captaining Celtic and gaining 76 caps for Scotland).

Honours

Player
Celtic
 Scottish League: 1925–26 
 Scottish Cup: 1922-23, 1924–25, 1926–27, 1930–31, 1932–33
Glasgow Cup: 1927–28, 1930–31

Manager
Alloa Athletic 
 Scottish Division Two promotion : 1938–39

Celtic
 Glasgow Cup: 1940–41
 Glasgow Charity Cup: 1942–43
 Victory in Europe Cup: 1945

Hamilton Academical
 Lanarkshire Cup: 1951–52

Managerial statistics

Does not include wartime matches with Alloa; P20, W10, D2, L8, WP50%
No competitive games played during his time at Celtic; wartime totals P220, W112, D38, L70, WP50.9%
Does not include wartime matches with Hamilton; P11, W2, D2, L7, WP18.1%
Wartime grand total: P251, W124, D42, L85, WP49.4%

References

External links

1895 births
1973 deaths
Footballers from South Lanarkshire
Association football wing halves
Association football defenders
Association football player-managers
Scottish footballers
Celtic F.C. players
Scottish Football League players
Scottish football managers
Alloa Athletic F.C. managers
Celtic F.C. managers
Hamilton Academical F.C. managers
Scottish Football League representative players
Larkhall Thistle F.C. players
Scottish Junior Football Association players
Hamilton Academical F.C. players
Scottish Football League managers
Jimmy
League of Ireland players
Expatriate association footballers in the Republic of Ireland
Scottish expatriate sportspeople in Ireland
Scottish expatriate footballers